The Special Immigrant Visa (SIV) programs are programs for receiving a United States visa. The program is administered under the Defense Authorization Act for Fiscal Year 2008, Public Law 110-181, which was signed into law on January 28, 2008.

SIV programs

For Afghan nationals who worked for or on behalf of the U.S. government
The Department of State has authority to issue SIVs to Afghan nationals under section 602(b) of the Afghan Allies Protection Act of 2009. A total of 34,500 visas have been allocated since December 19, 2014.

Eligibility
Requirements are:
 Being a national of Afghanistan
 Employed for at least one year between October 7, 2001, and December 31, 2023
 By, or on behalf of, the U.S. government. State Dept has included those directly hired by the U.S. government, contractors, and subcontractors. It has previously not included those who worked under grants and cooperative agreements. The Averting Loss of Life and Injury by Expediting SIVs Act of 2021 amended this to allow inclusion of grants and cooperative "if the Secretary of State determines, based on a recommendation from the Federal agency or organization authorizing such funding, that such alien contributed to the United States mission in Afghanistan"
 By ISAF or a successor mission in a capacity that required serving with US military personnel stationed at ISAF (or a successor mission)
 Provided faithful and valuable service to the US government as documented by a recommendation letter
 Must be experiencing a serious and ongoing threat as a consequence of such employment.

Application process
Applicants must email AfghanSIVApplication@state.gov, put their name and date of birth in the subject line, and attach:
 A recommendation letter from an American citizen who supervised the applicant directly, or if that person cannot be found, a recommendation letter from a non-US citizen counter signed by a US citizen who was overseeing the contract. There is no official template, but applicants may use an unofficial template that meets the requirements.
 A HR letter confirming that the employment of applicant for or on behalf of the US Government. There is no official template, but applicants may use an unofficial template that meets the requirements.
 The applicant's national ID (Tazkera) copy (electronic version, or paper version with an English translation).
 If available, the applicant's Afghan passport copy.
 A signed threat statement (in English) that explains the threats that the applicant has faced as a result of qualifying employment. There is no official template, but applicants may use an unofficial template that meets the requirements.
 If available, copies of the contract between the applicant's employer and the US Government.
 If available, copies of any badges that were issued to the applicant.
 The completed and signed DS-157 form.
 A biodata sheet containing their name, gender, marital status, etc. There is no official template, but applicants may use an unofficial template.

For Iraqi Nationals Who Worked for or On Behalf of the U.S. Government
Section 1244 of this legislation, entitled "Special Immigrant Status for Certain Iraqis", as amended by section 1 of Public Law 110-244, enacted on January 3, 2008, authorizes 5,000 Special Immigrant Visas (The Kennedy SIV Program for Iraqi Nationals Who Worked for or on Behalf of the U.S. Government) per annum for Iraqi employees and/or contractors for fiscal years 2008 through 2012. This provision creates a new category of Special Immigrant Visa (SIV) for Iraqi nationals who have provided faithful and valuable service to the U.S. government, while employed by or on behalf of the U.S. government in Iraq, for not less than one year after March 20, 2003, and who have experienced or are experiencing an ongoing serious threat as a consequence of that employment.

Eligibility
Foreign nationals must self-petition for this special immigrant visa classification only if they can establish that they meet the following requirements:
must be a national of Iraq;
must have been employed by, or on behalf of the United States Government in Iraq, on or after March 20, 2003, for a period of not less than one year;
must have provided faithful and valuable service to the United States Government, which is documented in a letter of recommendation from the employee’s supervisor that is approved by the Chief of Mission (COM);
must have experienced or be experiencing an ongoing serious threat as a consequence of the employment by the United States Government, as determined through a risk assessment conducted by the Chief of Mission (COM) or the designee of the COM;
must be able to clear a background check and appropriate screening as determined by the Secretary of Homeland Security (DHS); and,
must be otherwise eligible to receive an immigrant visa and otherwise admissible to the United States for permanent residence, except in determining such admissibility, the grounds for inadmissibility specified in section 212(a)(4) of the Immigration and Nationality Act (8 U.S.C. 1182 (a)(4)), relating to "public charge" shall not apply.

Relevant Laws
In addition to the program's enacting Defense Authorization Act for Fiscal Year 2008 legislation, the United States Congress has enacted various other statutes and amendments into public law with relevance to the S.I.V. program.

For Iraqi National Translators/Interpreters
Under section 1059 of the National Defense Authorization Act for Fiscal Year 2006, Public Law 109-163, up to 50 Iraqi and Afghan translators working for the U.S. military have been eligible for SIVs each fiscal year (FY). Public Law 110-36, which President Bush, Jr., signed into law on June 15, 2007, amended section 1059 by expanding the total number of beneficiaries to 500 a year for FY 2007 and FY 2008 only. In FY 2009, the number of visas available for this category reverted to 50 annually. In addition to these Frequently Asked Questions for Applicants, also see the USCIS Fact Sheet on Afghan and Iraqi Translators.

As amended, section 1059 provides for SIV status for eligible Iraqi and Afghan translators and interpreters who have worked directly with United States Armed Forces or under Chief of Mission (COM) authority.

References

External links
iraq.usembassy.gov
travel.state.gov
special-immigrants.com

Visa policy of the United States